The British Mediterranean Fleet, also known as the Mediterranean Station, was a formation of the Royal Navy. The Fleet was one of the most prestigious commands in the navy for the majority of its history, defending the vital sea link between the United Kingdom and the majority of the British Empire in the Eastern Hemisphere. The first Commander-in-Chief for the Mediterranean Fleet was the appointment of General at Sea Robert Blake in September 1654 (styled as Commander of the Mediterranean Fleet). The Fleet was in existence until 1967.

Pre-Second World War

The Royal Navy gained a foothold  in the Mediterranean Sea when Gibraltar was captured by the British in 1704 during the War of Spanish Succession, and formally allocated to Britain in the 1713 Treaty of Utrecht. Though the British had maintained a naval presence in the Mediterranean before, the capture of Gibraltar allowed the British to establish their first naval base there. The British also used Port Mahon, on the island of Menorca, as a naval base. However, British control there was only temporary; Menorca changed hands numerous times, and was permanently ceded to Spain in 1802 under the Treaty of Amiens. In 1800, the British took Malta, which was to be handed over to the Knights of Malta under the Treaty of Amiens. When the Napoleonic Wars resumed in 1803, the British kept Malta for use as a naval base. Following Napoleon's defeat, the British continued their presence in Malta, and turned it into the main base for the Mediterranean Fleet. Between the 1860s and 1900s, the British undertook a number of projects to improve the harbours and dockyard facilities, and Malta's harbours were sufficient to allow the entire fleet to be safely moored there.

In the last decade of the nineteenth century, the Mediterranean Fleet was the largest single squadron of the Royal Navy, with ten first-class battleships—double the number in the Channel Fleet—and a large number of smaller warships.

On 22 June 1893, the bulk of the fleet, eight battleships and three large cruisers, were conducting their annual summer exercises off Tripoli, Lebanon, when the fleet's flagship, the battleship , collided with the battleship . Victoria sank within fifteen minutes, taking 358 crew with her. Vice-Admiral Sir George Tryon, commander of the Mediterranean Fleet, was among the dead.

Of the three original s which entered service in the first half of 1908, two ( and ) joined the Mediterranean Fleet in 1914. They and  formed the nucleus of the fleet at the start of the First World War when British forces pursued the German ships Goeben and Breslau.

A recently modernised  became the flagship of the Commander-in-Chief and Second-in-Command, Mediterranean Fleet in 1926.

Second World War

Malta, as part of the British Empire from 1814, was a shipping station and was the headquarters for the Mediterranean Fleet until the mid-1930s. Due to the perceived threat of air-attack from the Italian mainland, the fleet was moved to Alexandria, Egypt, shortly before the outbreak of the Second World War.

In 1940, the Mediterranean Fleet carried out a successful aircraft carrier attack on the Italian Fleet at Taranto by air. Other major actions included the Battle of Cape Matapan and the Battle of Crete. The Fleet had to block Italian and later German reinforcements and supplies for the North African Campaign.

Post war

In October 1946,  hit a mine in the Corfu Channel, starting a series of events known as the Corfu Channel Incident.

In May 1948, Sir Arthur Power took over as Commander-in-Chief Mediterranean, and in his first act arranged a show of force to discourage the crossing of Jewish refugees into Palestine. When later that year Britain pulled out of the British Mandate of Palestine, Ocean, four destroyers, and two frigates escorted the departing High Commissioner, aboard the cruiser . The force stayed to cover the evacuation of British troops into the Haifa enclave and south via Gaza.

From 1952 to 1967, the post of Commander in Chief Mediterranean Fleet was given a dual-hatted role as NATO Commander in Chief of Allied Forces Mediterranean in charge of all forces assigned to NATO in the Mediterranean Area. The British made strong representations within NATO in discussions regarding the development of the Mediterranean NATO command structure, wishing to retain their direction of NATO naval command in the Mediterranean to protect their sea lines of communication running through the Mediterranean to the Middle East and Far East. When a NATO naval commander, Admiral Robert B. Carney, C-in-C Allied Forces Southern Europe, was appointed, relations with the incumbent British C-in-C, Admiral Sir John Edelsten, were frosty. Edlesten, on making an apparently friendly offer of the use of communications facilities to Carney, who initially lacked secure communications facilities, was met with "I'm not about to play Faust to your Mephistopheles through the medium of communications!"

In 1956, ships of the fleet, together with the French Navy, took part in the Suez War against Egypt.

From 1957 to 1959, Rear Admiral Charles Madden held the post of Flag Officer, Malta, with responsibilities for three squadrons of minesweepers, an amphibious warfare squadron, and a flotilla of submarines stationed at the bases around Valletta Harbour. In this capacity, he had to employ considerable diplomatic skill to maintain good relations with Dom Mintoff, the nationalistic prime minister of Malta.

In the 1960s, as the importance of maintaining the link between the United Kingdom and British territories and commitments East of Suez decreased as the Empire was dismantled, and the focus of Cold War naval responsibilities moved to the North Atlantic, the Mediterranean Fleet was gradually drawn down, finally disbanding in June 1967. Deployments to the Beira Patrol and elsewhere reduced the escort total in 1966 from four to two ships, and then to no frigates at all. The Fleet's assets and area of responsibility were absorbed into the new Western Fleet. As a result of this change, the UK relinquished the NATO post of Commander in Chief, Allied Forces Mediterranean, which was abolished.

Principal officers

Commander-in-Chief, Mediterranean Sea
Note: This list is incomplete. The majority of officers listed were appointed as Commander-in-Chief, Mediterranean Sea sometimes Commander-in-Chief, at the Mediterranean Sea earlier officers appointed to command either fleets/squadrons stationed in the Mediterranean for particular operations were styled differently see notes next to their listing

Commander-in-Chief, Mediterranean Fleet

The first Commander-in-Chief for the Mediterranean Fleet may have been named as early as 1665. Commanders-in-chief have included:

Chief of Staff
The Chief of Staff was the principal staff officer (PSO), who is the coordinator of the supporting staff or a primary aide-de-camp to the Commander-in-Chief.

Fleet Headquarters
The Mediterranean Fleets shore headquarters was initially based at Port Mahon Dockyard, Minorca for most of the eighteenth century. It rotated between Gibraltar and Malta from 1791 to 1812. From 1813 to July 1939 it was permanently at Malta Dockyard. In August 1939 the C-in-C Mediterranean Fleet moved his HQ afloat on board  until April 1940. He was then back onshore at Malta until February 1941. He transferred it again to HMS Warspite until July 1942. In August 1942 headquarters were moved to Alexandria where they remained from June 1940 to February 1943. HQ was changed again but this time in rotation between Algiers and Taranto until June 1944. It then moved back to Malta until it was abolished in 1967.

Senior Flag Officers with fleet responsibilities

Subordinate formations
Note: At various times included the following.

Parts of the Admiral of Patrols' Auxiliary Patrol during World War One were within the Mediterranean. Several patrol zones were under British authority.

Major support sub-commands 
Note: At various times included the following.

Minor shore sub-commands 

Included:

Notes

References

Further reading
 Corbett, Julian Stafford. England in the Mediterranean; a study of the rise and influence of British power within the Straits, 1603-1713 (1904) online
 D'Angelo, Michela. "In the 'English' Mediterranean (1511–1815)." Journal of Mediterranean Studies 12.2 (2002): 271-285.
 Dietz, Peter. The British in the Mediterranean (Potomac Books Inc, 1994).
 Haggie, Paul. "The royal navy and war planning in the Fisher era." Journal of Contemporary History 8.3 (1973): 113-131. online

 Hattendorf, John B., ed. Naval Strategy and Power in the Mediterranean: Past, Present and Future (Routledge, 2013).
 Holland, Robert. Blue-water empire: the British in the Mediterranean since 1800 (Penguin UK, 2012). excerpt
 Holland, Robert. "Cyprus and Malta: two colonial experiences." Journal of Mediterranean Studies 23.1 (2014): 9-20.
 Pack, S.W.C Sea Power in the Mediterranean – has a complete list of fleet commanders
 Syrett, David. "A Study of Peacetime Operations: The Royal Navy in the Mediterranean, 1752–5." The Mariner's Mirror 90.1 (2004): 42-50.
  Williams, Kenneth.  Britain And The Mediterranean (1940) online free

Fleets of the Royal Navy
Military units and formations of the Royal Navy in World War II
Crete in World War II
1967 disestablishments in the United Kingdom
Military units and formations established in 1690
Military units and formations disestablished in 1967
1690 establishments in the British Empire